Tetrix tenuicornis, the long-horned groundhopper, is a member of the Tetrigidae family.

References

tenuicornis
Orthoptera of Europe
Insects described in 1891